The Grosser Diamantstock is a mountain of the Bernese Alps, located west of Handegg in the Bernese Oberland.

References

External links

Grosser Diamantstock

Mountains of the Alps
Alpine three-thousanders
Mountains of Switzerland
Mountains of the canton of Bern